Kesly Jaritza Pérez González (born 9 May 1994) is a Nicaraguan footballer who plays as a defender for the Nicaragua women's national team.

Early life
Pérez was born in Bluefields.

International career
Pérez capped for Nicaragua at senior level during the 2018 CONCACAF Women's Championship qualification, the 2018 Central American and Caribbean Games and the 2020 CONCACAF Women's Olympic Qualifying Championship qualification.

References 

1994 births
Living people
People from Bluefields
Nicaraguan women's footballers
Women's association football defenders
Nicaragua women's international footballers